Navara may refer to:
David Navara, Czech chess grandmaster
Nissan Navara, pickup truck
Navara, a division of RAM Mobile Data, mobile device software company

See also
Navarra
Anna Navarre, of the Major Deus Ex characters
Novara (disambiguation)